Hypophytala hyettoides, the common flash, is a butterfly in the family Lycaenidae. It is found in Sierra Leone, Ivory Coast, Ghana, Togo, Nigeria (south and the Cross River loop), Cameroon and Equatorial Guinea (Bioko). The habitat consists of forests.

References

Butterflies described in 1895
Poritiinae
Butterflies of Africa